KLPW (1220 AM) is a radio station licensed to Union, Missouri, United States.  The station airs an Americana music format, and is currently owned by Broadcast Properties, Inc. The station transitioned to its current format from Talk radio in July 2017.

References

External links
KLPW's website

LPW